Baxter is an unincorporated community in Berkeley County, West Virginia, United States. The community lies near Tilhance Creek.

Unincorporated communities in Berkeley County, West Virginia
Unincorporated communities in West Virginia